The African Cup Winners' Cup was a seasonal association football competition established in 1975 and abolished and merged with the CAF Cup to form the CAF Confederations Cup in 2004. The African Cup Winners' Cup was open to the winning clubs of domestic cups in CAF-affiliated nations.

List of finals

Performances

By club

By country

Notes & references

Notes

References

External links
African Cup Winners' Cup - Rec.Sport.Soccer Statistics Foundation

 
African